Be-1 may refer to:

 Be 1, a Belgian premium television channel
 Beriev Be-1, an experimental WIG aircraft
 Nissan Be-1, a retro-style automobile
 
 Royal Aircraft Factory B.E.1